Ángela Sosa Martín (born 16 January 1993) is a Spanish footballer who plays as a midfielder for Primera División club Real Betis and the Spain women's national team.

Career
In 2007, Sosa became the youngest player to debut in the Primera División at 14 years and two days old for Sevilla.

Honours
Club
Primera División: Winner 2016-17, 2017-18
Copa de la Reina de Fútbol: Winner 2016

Individual
Primera División best player 2017–18

References

External links
 
 
 Profile at worldfootball

1993 births
Living people
Spanish women's footballers
Footballers from Andalusia
Spain women's international footballers
Primera División (women) players
Sevilla FC (women) players
Sporting de Huelva players
Atlético Madrid Femenino players
Real Betis Féminas players
Women's association football midfielders